Pranab Kumar Barua (born 23 August 1934) is a Bangladeshi professor and academic. He was awarded Ekushey Padak by the government of Bangladesh in 2019 for his contributions in the field of education. He is one of the Advisors of Bangladesh Awami League.

Early life
Barua was born on 23 August 1934 in Aburkhil village under Raozan Upazila in Chattogram District of the then British India (now Bangladesh). He received a Master's degree in Bengali literature and Pali. He received his professional B.Ed. degree with first class and earned PhD from Kolkata University. He also has degree in religious education such as Sutra.

Career
Barua started his career as a teacher. He has been teaching for 35 years. Among them, he was a visiting professor of Pali Department of Dhaka University. He served as the Principal of Kanungoopara College, Rangunia College, Agrashar Girl's College and Kundeshwari College. He has worked in spreading education, especially women's education across the country and founded many educational institutions.

Books
Barua wrote many books, some of them are:
 Bengali Buddhist contribution to the liberation war
 Buddhist religion and culture of Bangladesh
 Atish Dipankar
 Buddhist Code of Conduct
 How did I see mahā thero
 The life and the words of Gautam Buddha

Awards and recognition
 Raj Gaurab award by Thai king
 Mahatma Gandhi National Award
 Mother Teresa Award
 Ekushey Padak (2019)

References

1934 births
Living people
Academic staff of the University of Dhaka
Bangladeshi educators
Recipients of the Ekushey Padak
University of Calcutta alumni
People from Chittagong District